The solar flux unit (sfu) is a convenient measure of spectral flux density often used in solar radio observations, such as the F10.7 solar activity index: 
1 sfu = 104 Jy = 10−22 W⋅m−2⋅Hz−1 = 10−19 erg⋅s−1⋅cm−2⋅Hz−1.

See jansky for further information about related units.

References

External links
International solar flux unit

Units of measurement in astronomy
Radiometry